Hérisson is a commune in the Allier department, France.

Hérisson may also refer to:

Canton of Hérisson, former administrative division in Allier, France
Hérisson (river), a tributary of the Ain in Jura, France

People with the surname
Aurélien Hérisson (born 1990), French Brazilian footballer
Pierre Hérisson (born 1945), French politician
William Herisson (1894 - 1969), French World War I flying ace

See also
Pougne-Hérisson, French commune

French-language surnames